Sayed Hassan Hussaini (known as Sayed Hassan Akhlaq) is an  Afghan-Iranian philosopher.

Life 
Akhlaq was born in 1976, in Sayghan City, in the province of Bamyan, Afghanistan. He immigrated to Iran when he was four years old. Finishing primary and secondary schools in Mashhad, he started to study classical religious seminaries (in Qum and Mashhad). 

Afterward he studied Islamic traditional courses and was educated in the field of Islamic Theology and Philosophy in Razavi University of Islamic Sciences. 

He obtained his Master of Art degree in the field of Western philosophy from the Imam Khomeini International University and a doctorate (PhD) in Western philosophy from Allameh Tabatabai University. 

He has taught at some universities in Iran and Afghanistan, such as Payame Noor University (2008-2010), Al-Mustafa International University (2006-2010), Academy of Sciences of Afghanistan (2010) and Gharjistan Institute of Higher Education (2010). He acted as the adviser of Academy of Sciences of Afghanistan and Chancellor of Gharjistan University (Farah Branch). He works as the adviser for the Center for the Study of Islam and the Middle East in Washington D.C. Akhlaq, is affiliated with the George Washington University, the Catholic University of America, Princeton University University Center for Human Values, and Boston University's Department  World Languages & Literatures. He has given lectures at University of Idaho. and Purdue University Purdue College of Liberal Arts and University of Louisville College of Arts & Sciences Global Studies Directory: People, Organizations, Publications. Akhlaq gave talks on Islamic Science and its Relationship to Faith Islamization and ISIS  at the Catholic University's McLean Center for the Study of Culture and Values.

Activities 
He has managed the first Afghan intellectuals' magazine, Rayehey-e-azadi:the smell of freedom by international co-editorial staff for more than two years (2002-2003). 

He has published five books showing the author's intellectual trend. 

His dozens of articles have been published in scholarly and scientific journals (such as: Ayeneh Marefat: Beheshti University, Islam Pizuhi: IHCS, Zehn: Islamic Research Institute for culture and thought, Human Rights: Mofid University, Nebras: Nebras Research Institute in Kabul). 

Akhlaq is the first Afghan philosopher that presented papers in The XXII World Congress of Philosophy (2008 Seoul) and Catholic University of America (Washington DC: 2009). He, also, has published many papers on several profound websites like OpenDemocracy and HuffingtonPost 

Akhlaq is a professional member of American Academy of Religion, American Association of University Professors and American Philosophical Association and American Council for the Study of Islamic Societies in Villanova University. Akhlaq "has made," Global Studies Directory: People, Organizations, Publications writes "significant contributions to dialogue among civilizations with regard to comparative philosophy, modernization, and global studies."

Published work

Books 
 The Secular and The Sacred Complementary and/or Conflictual? (Washington DC.: The Council for Research in Values and Philosophy: 2017, LCCN 2017007504 (print) LCCN 2016053235 (ebook)  LC record available at Library of Congress)  It addresses the issue of the relation of the sacred to the secular: Indeed, the questions often asked are whether Huntingtons, Clash of Civilizations is today s reality? Is clash and conflict inevitable? This volume collects papers from scholars from all around the globe and digs into that question. Do the sacred and the secular necessarily end in conflict? Building on scholars such as Charles Taylor, Hans-Georg Gadamer, Jurgen Habermaus, and John Rawls, as well as the world s great religious traditions, the authors assembled here respond with a nuanced, but resounding, NO. A deeper read demands the possibility, indeed, necessity, of complementarity. It has become ever more urgent to discover the proper and complementary relation between the two so that both can be promoted through mutual collaboration. The deeper implications of the discussion can be perceived in many current global problems: cultural identity, multiculturalism, pluralism, nationalism, economic inequality, race, terrorism, migration, public education, and climate change. The volume unfolds in seven sections: Foundations; Sacred and Secular; Complement or Conflict; Hermeneutics; African traditions; South Asian Traditions; Chinese Traditions; and Islamic Traditions. It is fascinating to observe how the various authors grapple with unfolding the relation of sacred/secular, faith/reason, church-mosque/state, transcendence/imminence. The section on Islam illustrates this. These chapters deal with the thorny, usually misunderstood debate between the scholars and those, westerners refer to as fundamentalists or radicals. In the latter, there is no space left to reason, interpretation, or historical criticism. This ugly divide usually emerges in the hot-button issues like the treatment of women and religion-related terrorism. However, these oversimplifications betray the intellectual roots of Islamic tradition. Here the argument is advanced that there are common and multiple meanings of rationality in the Islamic primary sources and that doctrine, the Quran, and the Sunnah, open considerable space for the rational and the secular in Islamic teachings. Unknown to most in the West, the grappling within Islam goes on. Moreover, the grappling seems to be heating up in all traditions. We are all called to the discussion. Our globe needs it! 
From Rumi to Nietzsche (Qom: Sulok-e Javan: 1386/2007 Solar Hejri): A collection of comparative articles seeking to dialogue between among  tradition, modernity and postmodernity  by selecting human  subjects such as life, human rights, intuition, religion, rationality and freedom. Mawlana and Suhravardi are selected from traditional world and Kant from modern world and Nietzsche and Heidegger from postmodern world. These articles presented before in international conferences, and because of the new reading from the above-said philosophers, they were very welcomed (pleasant). LC record available at Az Mawlānā tā Nīchah
The Philosophical discourse between Islam and the West (Qom: Al-Mustafa International University, 1387/2008): This book has a comparative approach in the subjects of being, time, causality, the arguments for the existence of God, the meaning of religious language between transcendental wisdom and some of western well-known philosophers such as Heidegger, Bergson, Hume, Kant and linguistic analysis philosophers. LC record available at LC Catalog)
The Tradition of Enlightenment in the West and Islam (Tehran: Amir Kabir, 1389/2009): This book  make a comparison between the Islamic peripatetic philosophy and the enlightenment philosophy of the eighteenth century, in detail. That means it is seeking to present a  philosophical reading from the western modernity and enlightened intellectual reading from the Islamic philosophy. In the fact, this book criticizes two dominated thinking on the Islamic world: this fact that the outrace of Islamic philosophy is transcendent wisdom and the matter that Islamic philosophy is not but Islamic theology and accordingly philosophy. Also, it has a positivistic look at the enlightenment philosophy and its latent redeemer matters. LC record available at LC Catalog.
From tradition of Balkh to modernity of Paris (Kabul: Nebras Research Institute, 1389/2010, B745.N49 A44 2011): this book  has been published by Nebras organization and Sayed publication in Kabul and includes ten research articles. First article is about differences and similarities among literature, philosophy and criticism.  The second one compare and study three important thinking personality (Abu Zaid Balkhi, Abu Al-Qasim Balkhi, Abu Al-Mansor Maturidi ) who has been effective  in Afghanistan and discuss them from the point of view of their utility for this country. Its two last Article study the notions of Al-Afghani and criticize him while they are mentioning important and helpful points of his ideas. Other articles take a comparative look at the opinions of Al-Farabi, Avicenna, Averroes, Abu Hamid Al-Ghazzali, Mawlana with  Machiavelli,  intellectuals and Jean-Jacques Rousseau. This book discusses very new ideas such as earthen look at Al-Farabi's policy, or Ibn Roshd's idea of progress which is really controversial by itself among scholars. Above-said books try to institutionalize dialogue among cultures, modern and pre-modern world, Islam and west and also open a way to a kind of inward looking and domestic development. LC record available at LC Catalog.
The Philosophical Meditations of Allameh Ghuryani (Kabul: Amiri publication, 1398/2019, B978.9936.652.21.7)

References

External links 

 Voice of America - Interview with Dr. Akhlaq (1) Interview with Dr. Akhlaq (2)

Princeton University, University Center for Human Values
Boston University 
The Council for Research in Values and Philosophy
HuffingtonPost
OpenDemocracy
PhilPeople
ResearchGate

Living people
1976 births
Afghan philosophers
Hazara writers
Hazara people
People from Bamyan Province
Imam Khomeini International University alumni
Academic staff of Payame Noor University